
Gmina Wołomin is an urban-rural gmina (administrative district) in Wołomin County, Masovian Voivodeship, in east-central Poland.

Villages
Apart from the town of Wołomin, Gmina Wołomin contains the villages and settlements of Cięciwa, Czarna, Duczki, Helenów, Leśniakowizna, Lipinki, Majdan, Mostówka, Nowe Grabie, Nowe Lipiny, Ossów, Stare Grabie, Stare Lipiny, Stare Lipiny B, Turów and Zagościniec.

Neighbouring gminas
Gmina Wołomin is bordered by the towns of Kobyłka and Zielonka, and by the gminas of Klembów, Poświętne and Radzymin.

References

Polish official population figures 2006

Wolomin
Wołomin County